Chhaupadi is a form of menstrual taboo which prohibits women and girls from participating in normal family activities while menstruating, as they are considered "impure". Chhaupadi is said to be practiced primarily in the western part of Nepal, but the same is true for city dwellers also. It is practiced all over the country with different names and practiced in different ways.

During chhaupadi, women are banned from the house and are made to live in a cattle shed (mainly in the western region of the country), or a makeshift dwelling known as a menstruation hut, for the duration of their period. Childbirth in Nepal also results in a similar form of confinement. During menstruation, women and girls are restricted from participating in everyday life events, and from interacting with their communities.

Origin
The word Chhaupadi was originated in the Western part of Nepal. The practice of chhaupadi originates from the superstition that menstruation causes women to be temporarily impure. This superstition arose from a myth that Indra created menstruation as a means to distribute a curse. In this belief system, it is thought that if a menstruating woman touches a tree, it will never again bear fruit; if she consumes milk, the cow will not give any more milk; if she reads a book, Saraswati, the goddess of education, will become angry; if she touches a man, he will be ill.

The practice persists in rural areas primarily in Western Nepal. It is also called ‘chhue’ or ‘bahirhunu’ in Dadeldhura, Baitadi and Darchula, ‘chhaupadi’ in Achham, and ‘chaukulla’ or ‘chaukudi’ in Bajhang district.
It is also practiced all over the country, the only difference is the way of practice and how strict it is.

Description 
The tradition begins with an adolescent girl's first menstrual cycle, during which she remains in the shed for up to fourteen days; afterwards, she must spend the duration of each monthly period in the shed, until she reaches menopause. The girls and women living in the cities also follow the practice by living separately within the same room or house. Additionally, women who have just given birth must stay in the shed with their children for up to two weeks.

Menstruating women and girls are required to remain isolated from their family, and are forbidden from entering homes, kitchens, schools, and temples. During this time, they remain in what is often known as a menstruation hut, which is usually made from wood or stone. In some locations, women may stay isolated from their family in a separate room attached to the house, such as a shed used for storing tools. Furnishings are sparse, so the women often sleep on the floor with only a small rug for warmth. They may not touch family members, especially male family members, and food and water is passed to them in such a way as to prevent touching. Menstruating women are also restricted from participating in family, religious or social functions, such as attending the temple or going to weddings, and girls are prevented from going to school.

Women who are menstruating are barred from consuming milk, yogurt, butter, meat, and other nutritious foods, for fear that their impurity will cause cows to become ill. The typical diet during menstruation includes dry foods, salt, and rice. Menstruating women are also barred from using community water sources or performing daily functions like bathing or washing clothing.

Despite the social isolation of chhaupadi, women must still work, often in the fields, during menstruation.

Health and safety risks 
Women are exposed to multiple health and safety risks while practising chhaupadi. Huts are often poorly constructed and lack heat or ventilation, leaving women exposed to the elements as well as extreme temperatures during different times of year. Women are at risk of developing illnesses such as pneumonia or diarrhea while practicing chhaupadi, and are also vulnerable to attack by snakes and other animals. Risk of asphyxiation is high if a woman starts a fire in the hut to keep warm during the winter. Women have also been raped while practising chhaupadi. In addition, a study by Ranabhat et al. of women aged 12–49 in the Bardiya and Kailali provinces of Nepal showed that the practice of chhaupadi is significantly correlated with reproductive health problems such as dysuria and genital itching.

While exact numbers are not available, women and girls die every year while performing chhaupadi. Particularly in the far and mid-western regions of Nepal, a number of deaths have been directly related to the use of these huts. Causes range from being attacked by animals, to being bitten by scorpions or snakes, to illnesses from exposure. These are some examples of the deaths that have occurred due to chhaupadi:

An 11-year-old girl died in January 2010 stemming from diarrhea and dehydration from being kept in a menstruation hut. Both her family and neighbours refused to bring her to the hospital because they believed that they would become impure should they touch her.
Two young women in late 2016 who died from smoke inhalation and carbon monoxide poisoning from fires.
In May 2017, Lalsara Bika, a 14-year-old, died as a result of a serious cold-related illness from living in a menstruation hut.
In July 2017, 19-year-old Tulasi Shahi died from being bitten by a snake "twice, on her head and leg," while living in a cow shed being used as a menstruation hut.
In January 2019, an old Nepali mother and her sons, aged 9 and 12, died of smoke inhalation while living in their menstrual hut.
In early February 2019, 21-year old Parwati Bogati died from suffocation and smoke inhalation after lighting a fire to stay warm.

Public action against chhaupadi 
Community and organizational actions exist to combat the practice. In January 2019, local authorities demanded the destruction of chhaupadi huts in Bajura, the municipality in which a woman and her two young sons died in a hut. This resulted in the removal of 60 sheds, and the deployment of law enforcement to patrol for further removal.

Legislation 
Chhaupadi was outlawed by the Supreme Court of Nepal in 2005, but the tradition has been slow to change. In 2017, Nepal passed a law punishing people who force women into exile during menstruating with up to three months in jail or a fine of 3,000 Nepalese rupees. However, in the five months since the new law went into effect (in August 2018), no cases have been filed against those enforcing the practice. In late 2018, district governments in the far west of the country began denying state support services to citizens still enforcing the practice of chhaupadi, in an effort to reduce the practice.

See also 
 Culture and menstruation
 Carbon monoxide poisoning
Menstrual Hygiene Day
 Ritual purity

References

External links
 (BBC) Women hail menstruation ruling
 (BBC) Nepal's 'confined women' want change
 (National Geographic) The Risky Lives of Women Sent Into Exile—For Menstruating
(The New York Times) In Nepal, Exiled Each Month (video)
(The Christian Science Monitor) Nepal's Menstruation huts 
(NPR) In Hindu Ritual, Nepali Women Are Banished Once A Month

Nepalese culture
Superstitions of Nepal
Women in Nepal
Menstrual cycle
Feminine hygiene
Taboo
Feminism and health
Women's rights in Nepal